Opisthoteuthis depressa is an octopus found in waters near Japan.

Habitat
Most specimens of O. depressa live in the ocean's bathyal zone, where sunlight doesn't reach. Like many other cirrate octopuses, they live on or above the seafloor. This species isn't of interest to commercial fisheries.

Description

O. depressa is a small octopus. It has large eyes and small fins. Like other members of the cirrate octopus subgroup, it has a fleshy web connecting its arms, a small internal shell to support its body, fins to help it swim, and small fleshy tendrils called "cirri" lining its arms. The octopus may have been named for its relatively flattened or "depressed" body shape.

This octopus is very sexually dimorphic; in other words, males and females have noticeable differences. While females have a row of more or less uniform suckers lining each arm, males have a distinctive sucker arrangement. Males' suckers are very enlarged and crowded together, often with two or three side by side. This trait distinguishes males of O. depressa from those of other species.

The preserved type specimen of O. depressa is held in the Tokyo University Museum.

O. depressa hosts the parasite Dicyemennea umbraculum, which belongs to the larger group Dicyemida. Parasites in this phylum target cephalopods.

In the early 2000s, scientists studied the mitochondrial DNA of some coleoid cephalopods (octopuses, squids, and cuttlefish). They found that O. depressa had split from other octopus lineages early on.

References

External links
 Drawing of a male's distinctive suckers

Octopuses
Molluscs described in 1895
Molluscs of the Pacific Ocean
Cephalopods of Asia